Emulex Corporation is a provider of computer network connectivity, monitoring and management hardware and software. The company's I/O connectivity offerings, including its line of Ethernet and Fibre Channel-based connectivity products, are or were used in server and storage products from OEMs, including Cisco, Dell, EMC Corporation, Fujitsu, Hitachi, HP, Huawei, IBM, NetApp, and Oracle Corporation.

History

1979–1999
Emulex was founded in 1979 by Fred B. Cox "as a supplier of data storage products and data communications equipment for the computer industry." By 1983, Emulex was able to advertise its products as if grocery items: a 2-page spread headlined "One stop shopping for VAX users? Emulex, of course" showed 3 paper bags, each with the Emulex name and logo and each holding a large computer board. One bag also said "Disk Controllers" while the second bag said "Communication Controllers;" the third said "Tape Controllers."

In 1992, Emulex spun off what became ''QLogic.

Much of Emulex's early market was for Digital Equipment Corporation's VAX and PDP-11 systems. Computer History Museum's collections include an Emulex disk drive.

2000 to present
Headquartered in Costa Mesa, California, Emulex employed more than 1200 people in 2013. In 2000, Emulex acquired Giganet for $645 million, and in 2013 acquired Endace, based in New Zealand. On April 21, 2009, Broadcom made a proposal to the Emulex board of directors to buy all existing shares of Emulex for $764 million, or $9.25 per share, a 40% premium over the stock's closing price on April 20, 2009. After Emulex's board of directors recommended against the sale, Broadcom increased their offer to $11 per share on June 30, which valued the company at $925 million. On July 9, 2009, it too was rejected  Broadcom subsequently withdrew its offer.

In February 2015, Avago Technologies Limited announced it would acquire Emulex for $8 per share, in cash. Avago, a spinoff of Hewlett Packard, merged with Broadcom in May of that year. Avago assumed the Broadcom name.

See also
 Emulex hoax

References

External links
 [http://www.avagotech.com AvagoTech.com website (which redirects to broadcomc.com)

2015 mergers and acquisitions
American companies established in 1978
American companies disestablished in 2015
Broadcom
Cloud storage gateways
Companies based in Costa Mesa, California
Companies formerly listed on the New York Stock Exchange
Computer companies established in 1978
Computer companies disestablished in 2015
Computer storage companies
Defunct computer companies based in California
Defunct computer companies of the United States
Defunct computer hardware companies
Technology companies established in 1978
Technology companies disestablished in 2015